Trail of the Gold Spike is a 1984 fantasy role-playing game adventure published by Hero Games for Justice, Inc.

Plot summary
Trail of the Gold Spike is an adventure in which the player characters oppose the evil Condor as he tries to run a family out of their mining business.

Reception
William A. Barton reviewed Trail of the Gold Spike in Space Gamer No. 72. Barton commented that "Trail of the Gold Spike is simply a lot of fun - to read, play, or GM. If you play any of the systems for which the adventure is designed, I heartily recommend it as the next exciting installment of your gaming career!"

References

Role-playing game adventures
Role-playing game supplements introduced in 1984